In Judaism, angels ( mal’āḵ, plural:  mal’āḵīm, literally "messenger") are supernatural beings that appear throughout the Tanakh (Hebrew Bible), rabbinic literature, apocrypha and pseudepigrapha, and traditional Jewish liturgy as agents of the God of Israel. They are categorized in different hierarchies. Their essence is often associated with fire. The Talmud describes their very essence as fire.

Etymology
Hebrew mal’akh is the standard word for "messenger", both human and divine, in the Tanakh (Hebrew Bible), though it is rarely used for human messengers in Modern Hebrew as the latter is usually denoted by the term shaliyakh.  The noun derives from the verbal consonantal root l-’-k, meaning specifically "to send with a message" and with time was substituted with more applicable sh-l-h. In Biblical Hebrew this root is attested only in this noun and in the noun "Melakhah", meaning "work", "occupation" or "craftsmanship".

The morphological structure of the word mal’akh suggests that it is the maqtal form of the root denoting the tool or the means of performing it. The term Mal'akh therefore simply means the one who is sent, often translated as "messenger" when applied to humans; for instance, Mal’akh is the root of the name of the prophet Malachi, whose name means "my messenger". In modern Hebrew, mal’akh is the general word for "angel"; it is also related to the words for "angel" in Arabic (malak ), Aramaic and Ethiopic.

In the Tanakh (Hebrew biblical texts)
The Tanakh reports that angels appeared to each of the Patriarchs, to Moses, Joshua, and numerous other figures. They appear to Hagar in Genesis 16:9, to Lot in Genesis 19:1, and to Abraham in Genesis 22:11, they ascend and descend Jacob's Ladder in Genesis 28:12 and appear to Jacob again in Genesis 31:11–13. God promises to send one to Moses in Exodus 33:2, and sends one to stand in the way of Balaam in Numbers 22:31.

Isaiah speaks of  mal’ak panav, "the angel of the presence" ("In all their affliction He was afflicted, and the angel of His presence saved them: in His love and in His pity He redeemed them; and He bore them, and carried them all the days of old") (Isaiah 63:9).

The Book of Psalms says "For He Will give His Angels Charge over you, to keep you in all your ways" (Psalms 91:11).

The figure of "the angel of the " (Heb. ; mal’akh YHVH) has been perceived by generations of exegetes and interpreters as obscure and perplexing. Almost every appearance of this figure in the Tanakh complies to the following pattern:
 He behaves as if he were a deity, e.g. promising fertility (Genesis 21:18), annihilating an army with a single blow (e.g. 2 Kings 19:32–36), or merely delivering a speech in which the angel presents himself as God (e.g. Exodus 3:2–4);
 The interlocutors of this figure address and revere him in a way reserved exclusively to a deity.
As such, the incident leaves the reader with the question whether it was an angel or a deity who had just appeared.

Angels and healing from impurity
There are instances in the Bible where angels have the ability to heal an individual from impurity; however, the question may arise whether seraphim are angels. For example, in the book of Isaiah, Isaiah sees seraphim praising the Lord. Their voices were so powerful that they make the pivots on the thresholds shake and filled the temple with smoke. (Isaiah 6: 3–4) All of this power made Isaiah feel unworthy and unclean so he cried out, "Woe is me! (Isaiah 6:5) Then one of the seraphim flew to Isaiah and touched his mouth with a live coal that “had been taken from the altar with a pair of tongs.” Once the seraph had touched Isaiah's lips with the coal, he then said, “Now that this has touched your lips, your guilt has departed and your sin is blotted out.” (Isaiah 6: 6–7)

In the Book of Zechariah, Joshua was standing before the angel of the Lord, and God. (Zechariah 3:3) He was “dressed in filthy clothes” when standing before them. The angel then commanded him to take off his filthy clothing and gave him “festal apparel” and a clean turban to put on. At the removal of Joshua's filthy clothing, the angel proclaimed, “See, I have taken your guilt away from you.” (Zechariah 3: 4–5) Thus, the removal of Joshua's filthy clothing was like healing him from his guilt.

Angels and prayer
In the Book of Zechariah, Zechariah hears from the Lord that He had been angry with his ancestors due to their evil deeds. He promised them that if they “return[ed] to [Him], [He] would return to [them].” Then the angel of the Lord prayed to the Lord and said, “O Lord of hosts, how long will you withhold mercy from Jerusalem and the cities of Judah, with which you have been angry these seventy years?” Thus, the angel of the Lord prayed to God in order to petition for the people (Zechariah 1:12).

Angels as warriors
In the Bible there are some references to angels acting as warriors, and protectors of all that is good. One of these references is The Book of Daniel which contains four apocalyptic visions. However, in Daniel 10:13, it makes reference to a sort of battle between the prince of the kingdom of Persia and the speaker who is believed to be Gabriel. Here Gabriel tells Daniel that the chief of princes, Michael, helped him in the opposition he was facing from the prince of the kingdom of Persia. Thus, both angels are acting as warriors for the good against the bad opposition from the prince of the kingdom of Persia. In addition, in Daniel 12:1, the speaker, Gabriel says that the angel Michael is the protector of the Israelite people and is a great prince.

Angels as messengers
In many passages from the Tanakh, angels are utilized as messengers; indeed, there is no specific Hebrew equivalent for the English word “angel”. Angels seem to have the appearance of ordinary humans; they are typically men and (unlike seraphim), have no wings. The presence of an angelic messenger versus a human messenger must be determined by the context of the passage.

Regardless, messenger angels are a highly important part of preserving and strengthening the link, as well as necessary distance, of God to humans. The nature of the knowledge that angelic messengers carry is always heavenly; that is to say, it is divine, and only by sanction from God can it be transmitted to humans, and only for necessary reasons. When an angel delivers the knowledge of God, his own identity is effaced by that of his Lord; that is, he speaks directly for God.

Examples of this role can be seen in numerous famous passages from the Old Testament, including the three mysterious men in the story of Abraham and the destruction of Sodom in Genesis 18:1–19:23, as well as the angel who informs Samson's mother of the nature of the baby she carries in Judges 13:3–5. In these examples, the angels are disguised, their identities unimportant in relation to the heavenly magnitude of the knowledge they possess; they are entirely defined by their jobs.

Angels as teachers in Jewish apocalyptic literature
Angels in the roles of teachers become especially important in Jewish apocalyptic literature, in such books as Daniel, Zechariah, and 4 Ezra, which feature enigmatic and terrifying prophetic visions experienced by unknowing humans who need heavenly guidance to understand what they have witnessed; no longer does prophecy come with full or immediate understanding.  Rather, a type of commentary or explanation of the vision is provided through the figure of an interpreting angel, whose teachings dispel the ignorance of the prophet and allow him to better understand, and thus better propagate, the knowledge of the end times that his vision contains.

Such knowledge of the apocalypse had both heavenly and earthly implications, and assumed a great deal of importance to the oppressed people of Israel at the time, who needed explanations for why God would let them go through so much hardship; thus, the knowledge was “good.”  Because of the bizarre features of the visions contained in such apocalyptic literature, interpreting angels assume the roles of teachers rather than just messengers; instead of just conveying information, they must explain it.

As teachers, they convey the full might and authority of heaven, while being able to comfort their distressed human charges in a more relatable way than if the prophets were directly spoken to by God. Thus, angels as teachers function as relatable interpreters and testaments to God's power, while also increasing His transcendence. Most of all, they were important in establishing human prophets in their proper role as comforters, with “good” knowledge, to the people of Israel.

In 4 Ezra, the interpreting or teaching angel is Uriel. When Ezra expresses his distress about issues that would be similarly preoccupying Jews of his time—namely, why God would allow His chosen people to suffer under the oppression of the Gentiles—Uriel is sent from heaven by God to help relieve his ignorance. In the passage, Ezra argues with Uriel about matters of justice in a way that he never could with God; however, the angel argues back with a series of riddles that eventually show Ezra the misguidedness of his thinking (4 Ezra 3:1–4:21). Importantly, Uriel does not simply transmit information or “speak at” Ezra; the two are engaged in an animated dialogue that reflects that of a teacher and a student, with the former guiding the latter to a realization. Ezra could never argue with God the way he argues with Uriel; however, this argument and its accompanying emotional catharsis is partially what leads him to discover the truth and main message of the passage on his own.

In Daniel, angels also assume the roles of interpreters and teachers, notably in their abilities to explain visions concerning the eschaton, and help human prophets unknot knowledge from it. In Daniel, it is the archangel Gabriel who is sent down from heaven by God to explain Daniel's perplexing visions and help relieve some of his distress (Daniel 8:16–17). In Daniel 7–12, the good knowledge that is transmitted to Daniel and thus to the rest of the population, is that the earthly events that have been so oppressing the Jewish people are being mirrored in heaven, and that justice will eventually reign in the form of a final battle pitting the armies of heaven against evil forces, which will be vanquished.

However, Daniel is only aware of this information due to the assistance of Gabriel, who teaches him the correct interpretation of his vision, and encouraging him when he falters (Daniel 8:15–27). This role of angels is mirrored in Zechariah, where angelic interpretation and teaching is necessary to unravel the bizarre visions that the prophet witnesses. In the passage, the angel literally walks through Zechariah's visions with him, explaining and teaching him as they go along so that Zechariah properly understands God's intended meaning (Zechariah 1:9–5:11).

In rabbinic literature
As a subcategory of heavenly beings, mal’akim occupy the sixth rank of ten in Maimonides' Jewish angelic hierarchy.

Michael, Gabriel, Uriel, and Raphael
The Talmud names four angels who would later be known as archangels, surrounding God's throne:

Angelic hierarchy

Maimonides
Maimonides, in his Mishneh Torah, counted ten ranks of angels in the Jewish angelic hierarchy, beginning from the highest:

Zohar 
The Zohar, in Exodus 43a, also lists ten ranks of angels, beginning from the highest:

Maseket Atzilut
Jacob Nazir, in his Maseket Atzilut, also listed ten ranks of angels, beginning from the highest:

Berit Menuchah
Abraham ben Isaac of Granada, in his Berit Menuchah, also listed ten ranks of angels, beginning from the highest:

Reshit Chochmah
Eliyahu de Vidas, in his Reshit Chochmah, also listed ten ranks of angels, beginning from the highest:

In Kabbalah
Kabbalah describes the angels at length. Angels are described in Kabbalah literature as forces that send information, and sensations, between mankind and the Tetragrammaton. They are analogized to atoms, wavelengths or channels that help God in his creation, and it is therefore, reasoned that they should not be worshipped, prayed to, nor invoked. They are not physical in nature but spiritual beings, like spiritual atoms. Therefore, the Kabbalah reasons, when they appear in the Hebrew Bible their description is from the viewpoint of the person that received the vision or prophesy or occurrence, which will be anthropomorphic. However, they are not material beings but are likened to a single emotion, feeling, or material, controlled by God for his purpose of creation.

In Jewish liturgy 
On returning home from services on Friday night, the eve of Shabbat, or at the dinner-table before dinner Friday night, it is customary in Orthodox Judaism and Conservative Judaism to bring in Shabbat with a traditional hymn which mentions angels:

Before going to sleep, many Jews recite a traditional prayer naming four archangels, "To my right Michael and to my left Gabriel, in front of me Uriel and behind me Raphael, and over my head God's Shekhinah ['the presence of God']."

On the Jewish holiday of  Simchat Torah, it is customary to call all the boys (in some synagogues, all the children) to the Torah reading and for the whole congregation to recite a verse from  Jacob's blessing to Ephraim and Manasheh (Manassas).

See also 
 List of angels in theology
 Angels in Islam
 Sukkal
 Uthra

References

External links
 Jewish Encyclopedia, "Angelology"
 Jewish POV: Angels and Demons (YouTube)
 Israel Regardie, The Golden Dawn, Llewellyn Publications, 1992, 
 Elyonim veTachtonim. An on-line database of angels, demons, ghosts and monsters in the Bible and Babylonian Talmud.